Luis Lacalle may refer to:
Luis Alberto Lacalle de Herrera, Uruguayan lawyer and politician, President of the Republic 1990–1995.
Luis Alberto Lacalle Pou, Uruguayan lawyer and politician, son of the former. President of the Republic since 2020.